Continuous with the dorsal end of the first pharyngeal arch, and growing forward from its cephalic border, is a triangular process, the maxillary prominence (or maxillary process), the ventral extremity of which is separated from the mandibular arch by a ">"-shaped notch.

The maxillary prominence forms the lateral wall and floor of the orbit, and in it are ossified the zygomatic bone and the greater part of the maxilla; it meets with the medial nasal prominence, from which, however, it is separated for a time by a groove, the naso-optic furrow, that extends from the furrow encircling the eyeball to the nasal pit.

The maxillary prominences ultimately fuse with the medial nasal prominence and the globular processes, and form the lateral parts of the upper lip and the posterior boundaries of the nares.

It is innervated by the maxillary nerve.

Additional images

References

External links

Embryology